The Oath is a 2018 American black comedy film written and directed by Ike Barinholtz, in his directorial debut. In addition to Barinholtz, the film stars Tiffany Haddish, John Cho, Carrie Brownstein, Billy Magnussen, Meredith Hagner, Jon Barinholtz, Nora Dunn and Chris Ellis, and follows a politically divided family at Thanksgiving after the U.S. government asks all citizens to sign a loyalty pledge.

It had its world premiere at the Los Angeles Film Festival on September 25, 2018, and was theatrically released in the United States on October 12, 2018, by Roadside Attractions. The film received mixed reviews from critics, although Haddish's performance was praised.

Plot
In the near future, American citizens are asked, though not required, to sign a legal document swearing allegiance to the United States government by Black Friday, the day after Thanksgiving. Meanwhile, couple Chris and Kai live a quiet suburban life with their young daughter, while Chris is deeply disturbed by the oath.

As Black Friday approaches, the young couple hosts their latest Thanksgiving dinner for their extended family. Chris' mother has made him promise not to discuss politics throughout the holiday; nonetheless, he tries to escape and catch the news whenever possible. Chris' brother Pat and his girlfriend Abbie, who have opposing political views, bother Chris throughout the entire holiday despite Kai's attempts to calm him. Chris is also disturbed to learn about the societal breakdown occurring in the nation due to the Oath's deadline, which all of his family members, including Kai, signed except for him.

On Black Friday, the family is visited by two governmental agents, Mason and Peter, who question Chris about his efforts to resist others in signing the Oath. Chris is defiant in answering the agents' questions which angers Mason and the two quarrel. During a skirmish, Peter gets knocked out with a concussion while the family subdue and tie up Mason. For the rest of the evening, Peter, while semi-conscious, tries to negotiate with the family for their release, yet Mason continues to antagonize them with various threats. One of those threats includes the notion that the family's children will be harmed.

At this moment, Chris draws Mason's own gun upon his head ready to kill him but Clark intervenes, telling the family to turn on the news, which indicates that the President has resigned and the new Acting President has revoked the Oath and its subsequent enforcement. The two agents with their authority taken away are released by Chris and Pat. The film ends with Chris and Kai peacefully eating apple pie.

Cast
 Ike Barinholtz as Chris Montana, Kai’s husband
 Tiffany Haddish as Kai Albert, Chris’ wife
 John Cho as Agent Peter Barber
 Carrie Brownstein as Alice, Chris' sister and Clark's wife
 Billy Magnussen as Agent James Mason 
 Meredith Hagner as Abbie Button, Pat's girlfriend
 Jon Barinholtz as Pat Kelmeckis, Chris' brother
 Nora Dunn as Eleanor Button, Chris' mother
 Chris Ellis as Hank Creason, Chris' father
 Matt Corboy as Clint Marks
 Jay Duplass as Clark Stewart, Alice's husband
 Priah Ferguson as Hardy Fontaine
 Henry Kaufman as Asher Wilton
 Max Greenfield as Dan Moore
 Bruce Boxleitner as Vice President Hogan

Production
In September 2017, it was announced Ike Barinholtz would write, direct, and star in the film. Barinholtz produced the film alongside Sean McKittrick, Ray Mansfield, Edward H. Hamm, Jr., Andrew Robinson, and David Stassen, under their QC Entertainment and 24/34 Pictures banners, respectively. In December 2017, Tiffany Haddish, John Cho, Carrie Brownstein, Billy Magnussen, Meredith Hagner, Jon Barinholtz, Nora Dunn and Chris Ellis joined the cast. Haddish also served as an executive producer.

Filming
Principal photography began in December 2017.

Release
In June 2018, Roadside Attractions and Topic Studios acquired distribution rights to the film. It had its world premiere at the Los Angeles Film Festival on September 25, 2018. The film was theatrically released on October 12, 2018.

Reception
The website's critics consensus reads, "The Oath draws on hyper-partisan modern politics for a pointedly funny satire that hits its targets hard and often enough to more than achieve its desired discomfort." At Metacritic, the film has a weighted average score of 58 out of 100 based on 27 critics, indicating "mixed or average reviews".

Michael O'Sullivan of The Washington Post called the film's screenplay "clever and sharp," and wrote it anchors itself as "at times all-too-true-to-life."

References

External links
 

2018 films
2010s political comedy films
2018 black comedy films
American black comedy films
American comedy thriller films
American political comedy films
2018 directorial debut films
American dystopian films
Films about fictional presidents of the United States
Roadside Attractions films
Topic Studios films
Thanksgiving in films
United States presidential succession in fiction
2010s English-language films
2010s American films